John Norton Tonge (9 July 1865 – 8 July 1903) was an English amateur cricketer who played for Kent County Cricket Club in the late 19th century.

Tonge was born at Otford in Kent in 1884, the son of William and Anna Tonge (née Bird). He grew up at Southam in Warwickshire and attended nearby Cheltenham College as a day boy. He did not play cricket for the school XI and worked in the London Stock Exchange after leaving Cheltenham. He played club cricket for teams such as Bickley Park, and an innings of 110 for the Kent Second XI against Gravesend saw him selected for the county First XI in 1884. He made his first-class cricket debut against Derbyshire at Gravesend.

He made four appearances for the county in 1885 and went on to play for Kent each season until end of the decade, being aware his county cap in 1887. Unusually for an amateur, he played more frequently on grounds away from Kent. He made a total of 36 first-class appearances for the side, although his batting for Kent never lived up to the form he showed at club level – he made several large scores for Bickley Park as well as for sides such as Blackheath and Band of Brothers, an amateur side closely associated with Kent.

After playing twice for Kent in 1895 and four times in 1897 before touring North America with Plum Warner's XI and making his final two first-class appearances against the Gentlemen of Philadelphia.

He inherited Morants Court at Chevening in Kent after the death of his father in 1891 and in 1892 married Edith Boosey. The couple had one daughter, but Edith died in 1893 and Tonge did not remarry.  After suffering from tuberculosis for some time, Tonge died in 1903 aged 37. His estate passed to his mother and his brother William, a British Army officer who played two first-class matches for Gloucestershire.

References

1865 births
1903 deaths
English cricketers
Kent cricketers
P. F. Warner's XI cricketers
People from Otford
People from Chevening, Kent
20th-century deaths from tuberculosis
Tuberculosis deaths in England